Charles Cropper Parks (1922 - October 25, 2012)  was an American sculptor who donated almost 300 of his works to the State of Delaware in 2011.

Biography
Charles Parks was born in Onancock, Virginia in 1922. He served in the air force during World War II, before getting an education at University of Delaware and the Pennsylvania Academy of the Fine Arts.

Parks and his wife, Inge, created the Charles Parks foundation in 2003. In 2011 the Parks family donated approximately 290 sculptures from Charles Parks' private collection to the State of Delaware, in the hope they would be displayed to the public.

Parks died in Wilmington, Delaware on October 25, 2012 age 90. Delaware governor, Jack Markell, described Parks as "an extraordinarily talented artist and sculptor whose life work made an impact on so many".

In April 2013 thirteen of Parks' sculptures were exhibited at the First State Heritage Park Welcome Centre and Galleries, organised by the Delaware Division of Historical and Cultural Affairs.

References

1922 births
2012 deaths
20th-century American sculptors
People from Onancock, Virginia
United States Army Air Forces personnel of World War II
Sculptors from Delaware
21st-century American sculptors